French Mandopop is a category of mandopop that appeared at the beginning of the 21st Century. As the name implies, French Mandopop features songs performed mainly in Mandarin Chinese with a French style or a French touch. Consumers of the music include fans, especially Mandarin speakers and Chinese people attracted by French culture, in China, France and other countries.

Characteristics
French Mandopop is characterized by the following features: French speaking singers who perform in Mandarin Chinese, with a French accent or not, a non-Chinese style melody, French style mix and mastering. Chinese lyrics and themes are inspired by France and French imaginary. French Mandopop is also characterized by a French way (or western way) of performing on stage, not or almost not influenced by Chinese aesthetics.

History

2000s
The pioneer of French Mandopop, Dantès Dailiang, was the first French singer songwriter who writes his songs and sings in Mandarin Chinese signed by a Chinese record company for his albums Parfums d’extrêmes, (simplified Chinese: 我记得你) in 2007 and Dailiang (simplified Chinese 下有戴亮), in 2009.

2010s
Due to the mutual attraction between China and France, more and more French artists try with more or less success to write or sing original songs in Mandarin Chinese. The phenomenon increased since the year 2010 when the first official French Music Festival was organized in Shanghai.

Labels
 Mainland China: Jiesheng Records
 Hong Kong, Taiwan, Europe: Plaza Mayor Company, Warner

Artists
 Dantès Dailiang
 Jil Caplan
 Joyce Jonathan
 Jean-Sébastien Héry
 Frederick

References

See also
 Chinese music
 C-pop
 Mandopop

Mandopop